Felix Schütz (born 3 November 1987) is a German former professional ice hockey player who played in the Deutsche Eishockey Liga (DEL).

Playing career
Schütz was drafted in the fourth round, 117th overall, by the Buffalo Sabres in the 2006 NHL Entry Draft. Schütz was drafted from the Saint John Sea Dogs of the Quebec Major Junior Hockey League after making the move to North America from playing in Germany with the Landshut Cannibals.

Upon completing his second season in the QMJHL between the Sea Dogs and Val-d'Or Foreurs in 2006–07, Schütz returned to Germany to play professionally in the Deutsche Eishockey Liga (DEL) with ERC Ingolstadt. Schütz posted an impressive 12 goals and 25 points as a rookie in the 2007–08 to earn a three-year entry level contract with the Sabres on 7 May 2008.

Schütz spent the next two seasons in the American Hockey League with Sabres affiliate, the Portland Pirates. Despite the possibility of remaining with Pirates for a third consecutive season, Schütz opted to play in Germany and returned to Ingolstadt on a two-year contract on 20 October 2010.

Schütz scored the overtime winning goal for the host country, Germany, against the U.S. in the opening-round of the 2010 IIHF World Championship.

During the 2011-12 season, he transferred to fellow DEL team Kölner Haie, where he played until the end of the 2012-13 campaign, followed by stints in the KHL (Admiral Vladivostok, Avangard Omsk, Dinamo Riga, Torpedo Nizhny Novgorod), at EHC München and in the Swedish Hockey League at Rögle BK.

In July 2017, he signed as a free agent in a return to former German club, Kölner Haie of the DEL.

Following a brief stint in the SHL with IK Oskarshamn, Schütz returned to the DEL during the 2019–20 season with the Straubing Tigers. In the pandemic delayed 2020–21 season, Schütz linked up with original club, EV Landshut, before agreeing to a one-year contract with his fifth top flight club, Adler Mannheim, on 15 December 2020.

International play

He was named to the Germany men's national ice hockey team for competition at the 2014 IIHF World Championship.

Career statistics

Regular season and playoffs

International

References

External links
 

1987 births
Living people
Adler Mannheim players
Admiral Vladivostok players
Avangard Omsk players
Buffalo Sabres draft picks
Dinamo Riga players
ERC Ingolstadt players
German ice hockey centres
Kölner Haie players
EV Landshut players
Ice hockey players at the 2018 Winter Olympics
Medalists at the 2018 Winter Olympics
Olympic ice hockey players of Germany
Olympic medalists in ice hockey
Olympic silver medalists for Germany
IK Oskarshamn players
EHC München players
People from Erding
Sportspeople from Upper Bavaria
Portland Pirates players
Rögle BK players
Saint John Sea Dogs players
Straubing Tigers players
Torpedo Nizhny Novgorod players
Val-d'Or Foreurs players